Jaura Sian is a village in the Gujranwala District in Punjab, Pakistan.

History
The village's old name was Jaura Mandi, but due to the dominance of the Sian caste it has become known as Jaura Sian. Sians are descendants of Raja Sian Singh, who later became Muslim on the division of the subcontinent, and stayed in the village for the rest of his life.

Population
Its population is about 5,000–7,000 according to the census of 1998.

Language
The dominant language is Punjabi with the accent Majih.

Culture
The village is its own union council. This village has a government secondary school for boys and girls, unlike many other villages in the locality. However, for boys and girls to get higher education they have to travel to Gujranwala or Wazirabad. There is no sui gas for the rural people of Jaura Sian.

References

Villages in Gujranwala District